James Gorrall Blair (January 1, 1825 – March 1, 1904) was an American slave owner, lawyer, and politician who served one term as aU.S. Representative from Missouri from 1871 to 1873.

Early life 
Born near Blairville, now Cynthiana, Kentucky, Blair's parents died when he was too young to remember them, and he was raised by relatives, including his maternal grandfather.  He received a limited education before moving to Monticello, Missouri in 1840, where he worked on farms.  He continued his education on his own, and was elected clerk of the circuit court which included Lewis County, serving from 1848 to 1854.

Blair studied law while serving as court clerk, obtained admission to the bar in 1854, and began a practice in Canton.

Political career 
A Democrat during the American Civil War, Blair supported the Union and opposed secession, but was unable to serve in the military because of poor eyesight and other health issues.  After the war he opposed most Reconstruction measures as being overly harsh to former supporters of the Confederacy.

Blair had opposed slavery, and supported adoption of the Thirteenth, Fourteenth, and Fifteenth Amendments, which ended slavery and guaranteed the right to vote regardless of race.  Democrats in Missouri largely opposed these amendments, causing Blair to join the Republican Party.

He served as delegate to the Republican state convention in 1870.  Later that year he was elected to the U.S. House as a supporter of the Liberal Republican Party, and he served in the 42nd Congress, March 4, 1871 to March 3, 1873.  During his term in Congress Blair attracted notice for introducing a bill (which did not pass) that would have legalized the polygamous marriages of Mormons in the United States, on the grounds that the children of these marriages should be considered legitimate.

Blair was not a candidate for renomination in 1872, and returned to practicing law and operating a farm in Monticello.  He maintained his interest in politics and returned to the Democratic Party, after Missouri Democrats tacitly accepted the constitutional amendments that the party had previously opposed.

Death 
He died in Monticello on March 1, 1904, and was interred at Forest Grove Cemetery in Canton.

References 

James G. Blair at The Bench and Bar of St. Louis, Kansas City, Jefferson City, and Other Missouri Cities

1825 births
1904 deaths
People from Harrison County, Kentucky
Missouri Democrats
Missouri Liberal Republicans
Missouri Republicans
Liberal Republican Party members of the United States House of Representatives
Members of the United States House of Representatives from Missouri
Missouri lawyers
Burials in Missouri
19th-century American politicians
Farmers from Missouri
People from Monticello, Missouri
People from Canton, Missouri